Dame Barbara Mary Plunket Greene,  (née Quant; born 11 February 1930), is a British fashion designer and fashion icon. She became an instrumental figure in the 1960s London-based Mod and youth fashion movements. She was one of the designers who took credit for the miniskirt and hotpants. Ernestine Carter wrote: "It is given to a fortunate few to be born at the right time, in the right place, with the right talents. In recent fashion there are three: Chanel, Dior, and Mary Quant."

Early life

Quant was born on 11 February 1930 in Blackheath, London, the daughter of Welsh teachers. Her parents, Jack and Mildred Quant, were both from mining families; however, they had been awarded scholarships to grammar school and had both attained first-class degrees at Cardiff University before they moved to London to work as school teachers.

Quant went to Blackheath High School. For college, her desire had been to study fashion; however, her parents dissuaded her from that course of study, and she instead studied illustration and art education at Goldsmiths College for which she received a degree in 1953. In pursuit of her love for fashion, after finishing her degree, she apprenticed with Erik, a high-end Mayfair milliner on Brook Street next door to Claridge's hotel.

Fashion career
 Quant initially sold clothing sourced from wholesalers in her new boutique. The bolder and more unique pieces in her collection started garnering more attention from media like Harper's Bazaar, and an American manufacturer purchased some of her dress designs. Because of this attention and her personal love for these bolder styles, she decided to take designs into her own hands. Initially working solo, she was soon employing a handful of sewing-machine operators; by 1966 she was working with a total of 18 manufacturers. A self-taught designer inspired by the culture-forward "Chelsea Set" of artists and socialites, Quant's designs were riskier and more unique than standard styles of the time. Quant's designs revolutionized fashion from the utilitarian wartime standard of the late 40s to the energy of the 50s and 60s' cultural shifts. She stocked her own original items in an array of colours and patterns, such as colourful tights. 

Quant's impact did not just come from her unique designs; in her boutique, Bazaar, she created a special environment, including music, drinks, and long hours that appealed to young adults. This environment was unique for the industry, as it differentiated from the stale department stores and inaccessible high-end designer store environments that had a hold of the fashion market. Her window displays with models in quirky poses brought a lot of attention to her boutique, where people would often stop to stare at the eccentric displays. She states, "Within 10 days, we hardly had a piece of the original merchandise left."

For a while in the late 1950s and early 1960s, Quant was one of only two London-based high-end designers consistently offering youthful clothes for young people. The other was Kiki Byrne, who opened her boutique on the King's Road in direct competition with Quant.

In 1966, Quant was named one of the "fashion revolutionaries" in New York by Women's Wear Daily, alongside Edie Sedgwick, Tiger Morse, Pierre Cardin, Paco Rabanne, Rudi Gernreich, André Courrèges, Emanuel Ungaro, Yves Saint Laurent, and Baby Jane Holzer.

Quant and the miniskirt

The miniskirt, described as one of the defining fashions of the 1960s, is one of the garments most widely associated with Quant. While she is often cited as the inventor of the style, this claim has been challenged by others. Marit Allen, a contemporary fashion journalist and editor of the influential "Young Ideas" pages for UK Vogue, firmly stated that another British fashion designer, John Bates, rather than Quant or André Courrèges, was the original creator of the miniskirt. Others credit Courrèges with the invention of the style. However, skirts had been getting shorter since the 1950s—a development Quant considered practical and liberating, allowing women the ability to run for a bus.

Quant later said: "It was the girls on the King's Road [during the "Swinging London" scene] who invented the miniskirt. I was making easy, youthful, simple clothes, in which you could move, in which you could run and jump and we would make them the length the customer wanted. I wore them very short and the customers would say, 'Shorter, shorter.'" She gave the miniskirt its name, after her favourite make of car, the Mini, and said of its wearers: "they are curiously feminine, but their femininity lies in their attitude rather than in their appearance ... She enjoys being noticed, but wittily. She is lively—positive—opinionated." The fashion model Twiggy would popularise the miniskirt abroad.

In addition to the miniskirt, Quant is often credited with inventing the coloured and patterned tights that tended to accompany the garment, although their creation is also attributed to the Spanish couturier Cristóbal Balenciaga, who offered harlequin-patterned tights in 1962, or to John Bates.

Later career
In the late 1960s, Quant offered short shorts that were the forerunner of hotpants and became a British fashion icon. In 1967 she designed berets in twelve colours for British headwear company Kangol. Quant's berets, featuring her daisy logo, are in her collection at the Victoria and Albert Museum. Through the 1970s and 1980s she concentrated on household goods and make-up rather than just her clothing lines, including the duvet, which she claims to have invented.

In 1988, Quant designed the interior of the Mini (1000) Designer (originally dubbed the Mini Quant, the name was changed when popularity charts were set against having Quant's name on the car). It featured black-and-white striped seats with red trimming. The seatbelts were red, and the driving and passenger seats had Quant's signature on the upper left quadrant. The steering-wheel had Quant's signature daisy, and the bonnet badge had "Mary Quant" written over the signature name. The headlight housings, wheel arches, door handles and bumpers were all "nimbus grey", rather than the more common chrome or black finishes. Two thousand were released in the UK on 15 June 1988, and a number were also released on to foreign markets; however, the numbers for these are hard to come by. The special edition Mini came in two body colours, jet black and diamond white.

In 2000, she resigned as director of Mary Quant Ltd, her cosmetics company, after a Japanese buy-out. There are more than 200 Mary Quant Colour shops in Japan.

Honours and recognition

In 1963 Quant was the first winner of the Dress of the Year award. In 1966 she was appointed Officer of the Order of the British Empire (OBE) for her outstanding contribution to the fashion industry. She arrived at Buckingham Palace to accept the award in a cream wool jersey minidress with blue facings. 
In 1990 she won the Hall of Fame Award of the British Fashion Council. 
She was appointed Dame Commander of the Order of the British Empire (DBE) in the 2015 New Year Honours for services to British fashion. She was appointed Member of the Order of the Companions of Honour (CH) in the 2023 New Year Honours for services to fashion. 

Quant received an honorary doctorate from Heriot-Watt University in 2006. In 2009, the miniskirt designed by Quant was selected by the Royal Mail for their "British Design Classics" commemorative postage stamp issue. In 2012, she was among the British cultural icons selected by artist Sir Peter Blake to appear in a new version of his most famous artwork – the Beatles' Sgt. Pepper's Lonely Hearts Club Band album cover – to celebrate the British cultural figures of his life.

Quant is a fellow of the Chartered Society of Designers, and winner of the Minerva Medal, the society's highest award.

Books by Quant
1966: Quant by Quant — her first autobiography
1984: Colour by Quant
1986: Quant on Make-up
1999: Classic Make-up and Beauty Book
2011: Mary Quant: Autobiography — her second autobiography

Trivia 

In the 1966 Donovan song "Sunny South Kensington", Quant and Jean-Paul Belmondo's drug use/abuse is immortalised in the lyric "Jean-Paul Belmondo and-a Mary Quant got stoned, to say the least".
French musician Laurent Voulzy dedicated a song to Quant on his 2001 album Avril
Quant is referenced in the musical number "This Is What We Want" in the 2014 stage musical Made in Dagenham, based on the 2010 film of the same name.

Personal life
She met her future husband and business partner, Alexander Plunket Greene, grandson of Harry Plunket Greene, in 1953. They were married from 1957 until his death in 1990, and had a son, Orlando (b. 1969).

See also
 Daisy, doll designed by Quant

Notes

References

Further reading
 Sandbrook, Dominic. White Heat: A history of Britain in the swinging sixties (Abacus, 2015) pp. 217–37.

External links

 
 
 Mary Quant at the Victoria and Albert Museum, London Accessed 3 June 2010.
 Mary Quant – Miniskirt – Icons of England
 Official website of Mary Quant Cosmetics

1930 births
Alumni of Goldsmiths, University of London
British fashion designers
Welsh fashion designers
Living people
Members of the Order of the Companions of Honour
Dames Commander of the Order of the British Empire
Chartered designers
People from Blackheath, London
People educated at Blackheath High School
British women artists
Welsh women artists
British women fashion designers
English people of Welsh descent